Bahal (also, Behal) is a small town in the Loharu tehsil in the Bhiwani district of the Indian state of Haryana. And Rajiv Gandhi Stadium is on it.

Places of interest
There are many temples in the village including  Khatu Shyam, Devi Mandir, Alakh Baba, Balaji Mandir and krishna mandir.

Bahal has a new police station on Rajgarh Road which also serves nearby villages.
Bahal also has a cereal market where farmers from in and around Bahal sell their agricultural products.

And there are four banks here.
•Punjab National Bank.
•State Bank of India.
•Allahabad bank.
•HARYANA Gramin Bank.

Transportation
Nearest railway stations:
Rajgarh/Sadulpur (Rajasthan) (
Loharu (
Bhiwani 
Rampura Beri 10 km
Nearest airports:
Delhi - Indira Gandhi International Airport)
Jaipur - Jaipur International Airport)

Education
There are many schools in Bahal including BRCM Public School (Gyankunj), BRCM Public School (Vidhyagram), Shriram international school and the Govt Sr. Sec. School, Shree Shyam Sr. Sc School.  There are  two colleges in the town, BRCM CET (Engineering College) and GDC Memorial College (Degree College). Government Girls College.ITI and Also BRCM Law College.

References

 

Cities and towns in Bhiwani district